The 1908–09 Scottish Districts season is a record of all the rugby union matches for Scotland's district teams.

History

Edinburgh District beat Glasgow District in the Inter-City match

Results

Inter-City

Glasgow District:

Edinburgh District:

Other Scottish matches

Midlands District:

North of Scotland District: 

North of Scotland District:

Western League: 

Eastern League:

Western League: 

Provinces:

Anglo-Scots: 

Cities:

Provinces:

English matches

No other District matches played.

International matches

No touring matches this season.

References

1908–09 in Scottish rugby union
Scottish Districts seasons